The 1994 World Junior Curling Championships were held from 2 to 9 April at Winter Sports Palace in Sofia, Bulgaria.

Men

Teams

Round Robin

(«W» — technical win; «L» — technical loss)

Playoffs

Rankings

Women

Teams

Round Robin

Playoffs

Rankings

Awards

WJCC All-Star Team:

WJCC Sportsmanship Award:

Sources

J
1994 in Bulgarian sport
World Junior Curling Championships
Sports competitions in Sofia
International curling competitions hosted by Bulgaria
April 1994 sports events in Europe
1994 in youth sport